Zhanyl Okoeva (born November 15, 1993) is a Kyrgyzstani weightlifter, competing in the 48 kg category and representing Kyrgyzstan at international competitions. She participated in the women's 48 kg event at the 2015 World Weightlifting Championships, and at the 2016 Summer Olympics, finishing in tenth position.

Major results

References

External links
 

1993 births
Living people
Kyrgyzstani female weightlifters
Sportspeople from Bishkek
Weightlifters at the 2014 Asian Games
Weightlifters at the 2018 Asian Games
Weightlifters at the 2016 Summer Olympics
Olympic weightlifters of Kyrgyzstan
Asian Games competitors for Kyrgyzstan
20th-century Kyrgyzstani women
21st-century Kyrgyzstani women